Paddy Saunders was an Irish sportsperson.  He played hurling with his local club Tullaroan and with the Kilkenny senior inter-county team from 1902 until 1904.

Year of birth missing
Year of death missing
Tullaroan hurlers
Kilkenny inter-county hurlers
All-Ireland Senior Hurling Championship winners